The 2021 Kashmir Premier League (also known as 2021 KPL or, for sponsorship reasons, SRG KPL 2021), was the inaugural season of the Kashmir Premier League which was established by the Pakistan Cricket Board. The tournament featured six teams and was held from 6 August 2021 to 17 August 2021 in Muzaffarabad, Azad Kashmir. The opening ceremony and first match of the tournament were held at the Muzaffarabad Stadium on 6 August 2021.

The final was held on 17 August and saw Rawalakot Hawks defeating Muzaffarabad Tigers by 8 runs to win the first title. Asif Afridi of Rawalakot Hawks was awarded the man of the match award for his bowling figures of 3/21.

Franchises

Squads

Promotion in media 
The league was promoted on social media by the hashtag #KheloAazadiSe. The brand ambassador of the 2021 KPL was Shahid Afridi and the official singer was Rahat Fateh Ali Khan.

Anthem

The official anthem of the KPL, “The Aazadi Anthem” was released on 16 February 2021 and it was sung by Rahat Fateh Ali Khan.

Broadcasting
For the inaugural season, "Blitz Advertising" and "TransGroup" were awarded broadcasting and production rights respectively.

Opening ceremony
The opening ceremony took place on the 6th of August 2021.

Venue
The whole tournament took place in Muzaffarabad, Azad Kashmir. Around 2,500 spectators were allowed to watch the match in stadium due to COVID-19.

Umpires

  Aleem Dar
  Ahsan Raza
  Asif Yaqoob
  Rashid Riaz
  Shozab Raza
  Faisal Afridi
  Ghaffar Kazmi
  Imtiaz Iqbal
  Ahmed Shahab
  Majid Hussain
  Mohammad Sajid

League stage

Points table

League progression

Fixtures
The schedule for the tournament was announced on 2 August 2021. The matches from 12 August onwards were rescheduled due to the Pakistan vs West Indies test series as the timings coincided with each other.

Playoffs

Preliminary

Qualifier

Eliminator 1

Eliminator 2

Final

Statistics

Most runs

Most wickets

Awards

Individual Awards

Dream Team

Controversies
On 31 July 2021, it was reported that foreign cricketers were requested by the Indian cricket board (BCCI) against taking part in the inaugural Kashmir Premier League (KPL) cricket tournament. Former Pakistani wicket keeper Rashid Latif tweeted that BCCI is warning other cricket boards that if their former players took part in Kashmir Premier League, they won't be allowed entry in India or allowed to work in Indian cricket at any level or in any capacity. Former South African cricketer Herschelle Gibbs, who played for the Overseas Warriors, also accused BCCI of pressuring him to not play in the KPL. The Pakistan cricket board (PCB) expressed displeasure at the reports that BCCI is trying to prevent players from joining the tournament and said that it would raise the issue with the relevant ICC forum. Responding to Gibbs and the PCB, the BCCI said that they are well within their rights to take decisions with respect to the cricketing ecosystem in India.

On 1 August 2021, former England spinner Monty Panesar pulled out of the tournament. He took to Twitter to reveal the news and said that, "I have decided not to participate in the KPL because of the political tensions between India and Pakistan over Kashmir issues. I don't want to be in the middle of this, it would make me feel uncomfortable." Panesar further said in an interview that "BCCI had 'advised' him that if he played in the event, the 'consequences' of his decision could include not being granted a visa to India in the future and not being allowed to work in the country."

On 2 August 2021, the BCCI urged ICC not to recognise the Kashmir Premier League due to the disputed nature of Kashmir region between India and Pakistan. In response, the ICC clarified that the tournament doesn't come under their jurisdiction as it is not an international tournament. The 2021 KPL received 15 million views within the first 5 matches and broke the record for Pakistan’s most viewed live sports event launch on digital media. The President of the KPL, Arif Malik, said that the BCCI’s efforts to stop the league only popularised it instead.

The KPL did not pay players for any player awards (e.g man of the match) and end of the season awards. They later cleared all player related dues in June 2022.

See also
Kashmir Premier League
Bagh Stallions
Kotli Lions
Mirpur Royals
Muzaffarabad Tigers
Overseas Warriors
Rawalakot Hawks
The Aazadi Anthem

Notes

References

External links 
League Records 2021

Domestic cricket competitions in 2021
Cricket in Pakistan
Muzaffarabad
Azad Kashmir
Kashmir Premier League (Pakistan)